The Honeymooners is a 2005 American comedy film directed by John Schultz. An updated version of the original 1950s television series of the same name, this adaptation stars a predominantly-African American cast featuring Cedric the Entertainer, Gabrielle Union, Mike Epps, and Regina Hall. The film was both financially and critically unsuccessful, with Roger Ebert being one of the few to give it a positive review.

Plot
The Kramdens and the Nortons are working-class neighbors; bus-driver Ralph Kramden (Cedric the Entertainer) and sewer worker Ed Norton (Mike Epps) are best friends. Ralph is constantly masterminding get-rich-quick schemes with which Ed tries to help. The driving force behind them is their wives, Alice Kramden (Gabrielle Union) and Trixie Norton (Regina Hall); the men are trying to make enough money to afford the homes they think they and their wives deserve. Meanwhile, Alice and Trixie make ends meet by waitressing at the local diner.

Cast

Production

Filming locations
 Ardmore Studios - Herbert Road, Bray, County Wicklow, Ireland
 Dublin, County Dublin, Ireland
 Jersey City, New Jersey, USA
 New York City, New York, USA
 Shelbourne Park Greyhound Stadium, Shelbourne Park, County Dublin, Ireland

Release
The film was released in theaters on June 10, 2005 with a PG-13 rating from MPAA for "some innuendo and rude humor". For its DVD release, several lines of more suggestive dialogue were cut from the film in order to gain a PG rating for family-friendly marketing purposes. The PG rated cut is currently the only version available on home video.

Reception

Critical response
The film received mainly negative reviews. On Rotten Tomatoes it has a rating of 13% based on reviews from 111 critics, with the website's consensus reading: "This pointless remake of the classic TV series only offers generic characters and gags." Audiences polled by CinemaScore gave the film an average grade of "B−" on an A+ to F scale.

Roger Ebert was one of the few to give it a positive review, 3 stars out of a possible 4, proposing that The Honeymooners was unusual among such adaptations in transcending the original while staying true to its spirit.

Accolades
2005 BET Comedy Awards
 Outstanding Lead Actress in a Theatrical Film — Gabrielle Union (nominated)

2005 Black Movie Awards
 Outstanding Performance by an Actor in a Leading Role — Cedric the Entertainer (nominated)

References

External links
 
 
 
 
 

2005 films
African-American comedy films
African-American films
2005 comedy films
2000s English-language films
English-language Irish films
Paramount Pictures films
Films based on television series
Films directed by John Schultz (director)
Films scored by Richard Gibbs
Films shot in Ireland
Films shot in New Jersey
Films shot in New York City
Films with screenplays by Barry W. Blaustein
Films with screenplays by David Sheffield
The Honeymooners
2000s American films